Joe Thomas (born 21 February 1996) is a Welsh rugby union player who recently played for Leicester Tigers in England's Premiership Rugby. His principal position is centre. He has previously played for the Ospreys and Dragons in the Pro14 and was a Wales under-20 international.

Career 
Thomas is a product of Morriston RFC and made his debut for the Ospreys regional team in 2015 having previously played for the Ospreys academy, Aberavon RFC and Swansea RFC, while also enjoying a loan spell at the Dragons, Joe also played in every game for Wales U20's when they won the grand slam.

On 21 June 2019 Thomas was announced as a new signing for Leicester Tigers.

Family 
Joe's father and uncle both played in a victorious Siam cup side playing for Guernsey in 2005.

References

External links 
Ospreys Player Profile

Welsh rugby union players
Ospreys (rugby union) players
Houston SaberCats players
Living people
1996 births
Leicester Tigers players
Dragons RFC players
Rugby union centres